The 2017 World RX of Latvia was the tenth round of the fourth season of the FIA World Rallycross Championship. The event was held at Biķernieku Kompleksā Sporta Bāze, in the Latvian capital of Riga. Johan Kristoffersson secured the drivers' title, after winning the event. Kristoffersson's closest rival for the title, teammate Petter Solberg, was involved in a first lap crash with Jānis Baumanis in semi-final 2. The semi-final was red-flagged as Solberg was taken to a hospital in Riga. At the hospital it was determined that he had broken two ribs and his left collarbone.

Supercar

Heats

Semi-finals
Semi-Final 1

Semi-Final 2

Final

Standings after the event

 Note: Only the top five positions are included.

References

External links

|- style="text-align:center"
|width="35%"|Previous race:2017 World RX of France
|width="40%"|FIA World Rallycross Championship2017 season
|width="35%"|Next race:2017 World RX of Germany
|- style="text-align:center"
|width="35%"|Previous race:2016 World RX of Latvia
|width="40%"|World RX of Latvia
|width="35%"|Next race:2018 World RX of Latvia
|- style="text-align:center"

Latvia
2017 in Latvian sport
September 2017 sports events in Europe